John Storrs may refer to:
 John Storrs (sculptor)
 John Storrs (architect)
 John Storrs (priest)

See also
 J. Storrs Hall, American nanotechnologist
 John Storr, Royal Navy officer